Blumeatin is a flavanone found in Blumea balsamifera, and has been reported to be present in Artemisia annua.

Structure 
Blumeatin has the skeleton structure of a flavanone with three hydroxy groups at 5, 3' and 5' carbon positions and a methoxy group at the 7 carbon position.

References 

O-methylated flavanones